Daniel David Ntanda Nsereko (born 1941) is a Ugandan judge and legal scholar. He was a member of the Appeals Chamber of the International Criminal Court (ICC) from 2008 to 2012, and currently serves as a judge on the Special Tribunal for Lebanon.

Early life and education 
Nsereko comes from a family of nine children. His father was a former lay preacher in the Anglican Church, until he became a Seventh-day Adventist in 1950. Nsereko was baptized into the Seventh-day Adventist Church in 1960, during secondary school.

Nsereko received his LLB from the University of East Africa, an MCJ from Howard University School of Law, and an LLM and JSD from New York University School of Law.

Legal career
Nsereko was nominated to the ICC in 2007. In 2009, he presided over an appeal of a criminal case against Germain Katanga. In 2012, he was part of the majority panel in an ICC case regarding the 2007–2008 Kenyan crisis. He became a judge of the Special Tribunal for Lebanon in March 2012.  He is currently a member of the Advisory Committee on nominations of judges to the ICC.

He is a member of the Crimes Against Humanity Initiative Advisory Council, a project of the Whitney R. Harris World Law Institute at  Washington University School of Law in St. Louis to establish the world’s first treaty on the prevention and punishment of crimes against humanity.

References

External links 
 Curriculum vitae

1941 births
Living people
International Criminal Court judges
The Hague Academy of International Law people
Academic staff of the University of Botswana
Ugandan judges of international courts and tribunals
Special Tribunal for Lebanon judges
Ugandan Seventh-day Adventists
University of East Africa alumni
New York University School of Law alumni
Howard University School of Law alumni